The LIII Legislature of the Congress of the Union (53rd Mexican Congress) was made up of senators and deputies members of their respective chambers. They began duties on 1 September 1985 and ended on 31 August 1988.

The senators of this legislature were elected in 1982 and also exercised their positions in the previous LII Legislature. The deputies were elected in the 1985 elections.

Deputies

List of members 

 Antonio Riva Palacio (speaker of the senate)
 Rosario Ibarra

References

See also 

 Congress of the Union
 Mexico Chamber of Deputies
 Senate of the Republic (Mexico)

Congress of Mexico by session
1985 in Mexican politics
1986 in Mexico
1987 in Mexico
1988 in Mexican politics